The Emerson String Quartet, also known as the Emerson Quartet, is an American string quartet that was initially formed as a student group at the Juilliard School in 1976. It was named for American  poet and philosopher Ralph Waldo Emerson and began touring professionally in 1976. The ensemble taught in residence at The Hartt School in the 1980s and is currently (2022) the quartet in residence at Stony Brook University. Both of the founding violinists studied with Oscar Shumsky at Juilliard, and the two alternated as first and second violinists for the group. The Emerson Quartet was one of the first such ensembles with the two violinists alternating chairs.

The Emerson Quartet was inducted into the Classical Music Hall of Fame in 2010. , they have released more than thirty albums and won nine Grammy Awards, as well as the prestigious Avery Fisher Prize.

In August 2021 the quartet announced its plan to disband at the end of the 2022–2023 season in order to focus on teaching and solo work.

Members
The current members of the group are: Eugene Drucker and Philip Setzer, violin; Lawrence Dutton, viola (since 1977); and Paul Watkins, cello (since 2013).

Previous members were: Guillermo Figueroa, Jr., viola (1976–1977); Eric Wilson, cello (1976–1979); and David Finckel, cello (1979–2013).

History
In the early 1980s, Deutsche Grammophon chose the Emerson Quartet to begin a series of recordings of the string quartet literature to be released on the new CD digital format. Cellist David Finckel called this a "huge break" for the ensemble, allowing it to develop a worldwide audience for its performances.

Instruments 
In addition to using their Stradivarius instruments, the Emerson quartet own instruments by Samuel Zygmuntowicz which they often favour in larger halls as they believe they have better projection. Violinist Eugene Drucker even says of his modern violin "In a large space like Carnegie Hall, the Zygmuntowicz is superior to my Strad. It has more power and punch."

Awards and recognition
Grammy Award for Best Chamber Music Performance:

1989 Bartók: 6 String Quartets
1993 Ives: String Quartets Nos. 1, 2; Barber: String Quartet Op.11 (American Originals)
1997 Beethoven: The String Quartets
2000 Shostakovich: The String Quartets
2005 Mendelssohn: The Complete String Quartets
2006 Intimate Voices 
2009 Intimate Letters 

Grammy Award for Best Classical Album:
1989 Bartók: 6 String Quartets
2000 Shostakovich: The String Quartets

Gramophone Classical Music Awards:
Chamber (Record of the Year) 1989 - Bartók: String Quartets Nos. 1–6
Chamber 2000 – Shostakovich, Complete String Quartets (Nos 1–15

In 2002 the Quartet were the Music Directors of the Ojai Music Festival. They also played for the Oscar nominated short film, The Little Match Girl. They have also won the Avery Fisher Prize, and in 2010, were inducted into the Classical Music Hall of Fame, with a ceremony held in 2011. In January 2015, the Quartet received the Richard J. Bogomolny National Service Award, the highest award in the classical chamber music world.

Recordings
Volume I - Dvorák: Quartet No. 12 in F, Op. 96 "American;" Smetana: Quartet No. 1 in E "From My Life." (1990) Book of the Month Records
Volume II - Brahms: Quartet No. 1 in c, Op. 51; Schumann: Quartet in A, Op. 41, No. 3 (1990) Book of the Month Records
Volume III - Borodin: Quartet No. 2 in D; Tchaikovsky: Quartet No. 1 in D, Op.11 (1990) Book of the Month Records
Volume IV - Debussy: Quartet in g, Op. 10; Ravel: Quartet in F Major. (1990) Book of the Month Records
Piston: Concerto for String Quartet, Winds and Percussion (1990) Composers Recording Inc
Cowell: Quartet Euphometric; Harris: Three Variations on a Theme (Quartet No. 2) (1990) New World
Imbrie: Quartet No. 4; Schuller: Quartet No. 2 (1990) New World
Beethoven: Quartet in F, Op. 135; Schubert: Quartet in G, D. 887 (1990) Deutsche Grammophon
Dvorák: Quartet No. 12 in F, Op. 96 "American"; Smetana: Quartet No. 1 in E, "From My Life." (1990) Deutsche Grammophon
Debussy: Quartet in g, Op. 10; Ravel: Quartet in F (1990) Deutsche Grammophon
Tchaikovsky: Quartet No. 1 in D, Op. 11; Borodin: Quartet No. 2 in D (1990) Deutsche Grammophon
Mozart: Quartet in B-flat, K. 458 "Hunt"; Quartet in C, K. 465 "Dissonance"; Haydn: Quartet in C, Op. 76, No. 3 "Emperor (1990) Deutsche Grammophon
Brahms: Quartet No. 1 in c, Op. 51; Schumann: Quartet in A, Op. 41, No. 3 (1990) Deutsche Grammophon
Beethoven: Quartet in f, Op. 95; Schubert: Quartet No. 14 in d, D. 810 "Death and the Maiden" (1990) Deutsche Grammophon
Bartók: Complete String Quartets (1990) Deutsche Grammophon
Mozart: The "Haydn" Quartets (complete) (1992) Deutsche Grammophon
Mozart: The Flute Quartets with Carol Wincenc (1992) Deutsche Grammophon
Prokofiev: String Quartets Nos. 1 & 2/Sonata for 2 Violins (1992) Deutsche Grammophon
Schubert: String Quintet in C, D. 956 with Mstislav Rostropovich (1992) Deutsche Grammophon
American Originals: String Quartets of Ives and Barber (1993) Deutsche Grammophon
American Contemporaries: Harbison, Wernick, and Schuller (1994) Deutsche Grammophon
Dvorák: Quartet in E-flat, Op. 87; Quintet in A, Op. 81 with Menahem Pressler (1994) Deutsche Grammophon
Mozart: String Quartet in G, K. 387; String Quartet in d, K. 421 (1995) Deutsche Grammophon
Webern: Works for String Quartet/String Trio Op. 20 (1995) Deutsche Grammophon
Schumann Piano Quintet Op. 44/ Piano Quartet Op. 47 with Menahem Pressler (1996) Deutsche Grammophon
Beethoven: The String Quartets (Complete) (1997) Deutsche Grammophon
Beethoven: Key to the Quartets (1997) Deutsche Grammophon
Meyer: String Quintet/Rorem: String Quartet No. 4 with Edgar Meyer (1998) Deutsche Grammophon
Music of Curt Cacioppo: "Monsterslayer") (1998) Capstone Records
Schubert: String Quintet; Late Quartets (1999) Deutsche Grammophon
Mozart/Brahms: Clarinet Quintets with David Shifrin (1999) Deutsche Grammophon
Shostakovich: The String Quartets (complete) (2000) Deutsche Grammophon
The Haydn Project (2001) Deutsche Grammophon
The Emerson Encores (2002) Deutsche Grammophon
Bach: The Art of Fugue, BWV 1080 (2003) Deutsche Grammophon
Haydn: The Seven Last Words of our Savior on the Cross, Op. 51 (2004) Deutsche Grammophon
Mendelssohn: The Complete String Quartets (2005) Deutsche Grammophon
Intimate Voices (2006) Deutsche Grammophon
The Little Match Girl (2007) Disney
Brahms: String Quartets (2007) Deutsche Grammophon
Bach Fugues (2008) Deutsche Grammophon
Intimate Letters (2009) Deutsche Grammophon
Old World-New World (Dvorak) with Paul Neubauer (2010) Deutsche Grammophon
Mozart: The Prussian Quartets (2011) Sony Classical
Journeys: Tchaikovsky, Schönberg (2013) Sony Classical
Berg: Lyric Suite; Wellesz: Sonnets By Elizabeth Barrett Browning (2015) Decca
Emerson String Quartet: The Complete DG Recordings (2016) Deutsche Grammophon (52 CDs)
Chaconnes And Fantasias - Music Of Britten And Purcell (2017) Decca
Schumann - String Quartets (2020) PENTATONE

See also
List of string quartet ensembles

References

External links

Emerson String Quartet official website
Artists' page on IMGArtists
BACH & friends Documentary

Musical groups established in 1976
American string quartets
Grammy Award winners
University of Hartford Hartt School
1976 establishments in New York City
Deutsche Grammophon artists